Enteromius guineensis is a species of ray-finned fish in the genus Enteromius. It is restricted to the Upper Konkouré River system in the Fouta Djalon highlands in Guinea.

References

Enteromius
Taxa named by Jacques Pellegrin
Fish described in 1913